Galadari may refer to:
 House of Galadari, a prominent Dubai-based Arab family
 Galadari Brothers, a United Arab Emirates-based conglomerate
 Galadari Hotel, a five-star hotel in Sri Lanka, in which Galadari Brothers are the controlling shareholders
 Galadari Printing and Publishing, a media company under Galadari Brothers
 Abdul Latif Galadari (1939–2002), an Emirati businessman
 Suhail Galadari (born 1977), an Emirati businessman